The Ranger APC is an armoured personnel carrier (APC) that was developed by Universal Engineering.

The vehicle was developed to counter the threat of IEDs on the battlefield.  It has a hardened steel monocoque crew safe ‘survivability’ capsule suspended within the outer hull. 

This survivability solution includes:
a. A ‘V’ shaped hull.
b. An armoured belly plate
c. A floating floor
d. An energy absorbing, suspended crew seating system which is designed to be quick release in an emergency and the individual seats can then be used as a stretcher to evacuate casualties who are WIA
e. An Integral spall lining
f. A tuneable survivability solution with options including:
1. Passive Armour
2. Active or Reactive Armour (ERA)
3. Hard kill DAS solutions
4. All automotive components are fitted out with of this resilient hull. Only the steering column enters this capsule.

References

External links
 Ranger High protected wheeled patrol vehicle UK Limited and Universal Engineering www.armyrecognition.com.

Configuration

Armoured personnel carriers of the United Kingdom